Patrick Henry High School is a public high school in Ashland, Virginia in Hanover County. Patrick Henry is one of four high schools in Hanover County, and the only High school in the western half of the county. In 1959, after years of deliberation, Patrick Henry High School began with the consolidation of Beaverdam, Henry Clay, Montpelier, and Rockville high schools. The western Hanover County high school enrolled students in grades eight through twelve. The name of the school, as well as the name of its literary publications, The Voice, The Spark, and The Orator, reference the history of American Founding Father Patrick Henry, Hanover County's most illustrious citizen. Even the school colors of red, white, and blue are a patriotic symbol of history.

In 1969, Patrick Henry High and John M. Gandy High School merged to form one integrated student body. Also in 1969, a new junior high school was built, and Patrick Henry opened that school year as a senior high school serving students in grades ten through twelve. When the junior high school was changed to a middle school in 1988, Patrick Henry became a high school enrolling students in grades nine through twelve. The school campus of West Patrick Henry Road, which consists of a complex of buildings, began as a campus style school. Additions of an auditorium, classrooms, cafeteria, new gymnasium, and renovations to the media center and administrative offices resulted in an all-enclosed facility in 1992. As the population and the needs of the school have changed, so have the dimensions of the school. A new addition/renovation was added to the facility in the fall of 2001 providing state-of-the-art career and technical education opportunities. This addition consisted of a broadcasting studio, a bio-technology lab, a communication technology center, a computer-assisted drafting lab, and three classrooms. Patrick Henry celebrated its 50th anniversary in September 2009. Patrick Henry High has an International Baccalaureate program, as well as a NJROTC program.

Extracurricular Activities

Athletics
Cross Country
Football - won the 1994 Virginia high school football state championship
Golf
Field Hockey
Volleyball 
The boys' volleyball program won 7 straight VHSL State titles (2016 5A Championship and 2017, 2018, 2019, 2020, 2021, and 2022 Class 4 Championships.) The 7 titles are tied with James River for the most volleyball championships in VHSL history
Cheerleading
Varsity Girls Competition Cheer
Basketball
Gymnastics
Swimming
Indoor Track
Wrestling
Baseball
Softball
Soccer
Tennis
Track
Lacrosse

Performing Arts
 Theatre
 Mixed Choir
 Show Choirs
 Band
 Strings

Notable alumni
Erron Kinney, NFL Tight End
Damien Woody, Former NFL offensive lineman. Current ESPN Analyst  
Mickie James, TNA/WWE professional wrestler, country music singer 
 Jeff Crowder, Randolph Macon College 1992 ODAC player of the year
 Lucas Hall, actor and guitarist 
 Louise Keeton, actress, model and playwright

References

Educational institutions established in 1959
Public high schools in Virginia
Schools in Hanover County, Virginia
1959 establishments in Virginia